Micro-Phonies is a 1945 short subject directed by Edward Bernds starring American slapstick comedy team The Three Stooges (Moe Howard, Larry Fine and Curly Howard). It is the 87th entry in the series released by Columbia Pictures starring the comedians, who released 190 shorts for the studio between 1934 and 1959.

Plot
The trio are employed as handymen in a recording studio at the fictional radio station KGBY. Larry and Curly battle back and forth as they unhook a pipe to connect it to a radiator. Moe gets mad at the two of them over their fighting only to slip and fall down. While not doing their work, the trio watches a recording session through a window as Alice Van Doren (Christine McIntyre) sings "Voices of Spring." She is recording this song under a pseudonym (Miss Andrews) to audition for a radio show, an endeavor to which her father (Sam Flint) objects. After she finishes her song, the Stooges' boss (Fred Kelsey) comes into the room and sees them not working. He orders them to finish the job.

Outside in the hallway, Larry and Curly accidentally hit Moe with two long pieces of pipe leading to an argument. Their boss intervenes and as he's yelling at them, he's accidentally struck with the same pipes. The Stooges flee into an adjoining recording room with their boss on their heels. The room is occupied by an evil bad-tempered Italian baritone singer/violinist (Gino Corrado) and piano player in a session. During the battle with their boss, they end up destroying the singer's glasses and violin. They defeat their boss only to have the irate singer attack them forcing them to run again into another room.

Inside the room, which served as the recording room for Alice, they pretend to be recording a ridiculous soap commercial (with Moe portraying the voice of The Shadow radio narrator Bret Morrison), before finding Alice's record. Impressed by the operatic virtuosity of this stunningly beautiful soprano (Christine McIntyre was, in fact, a trained opera singer) Curly lip syncs, as the other stooges adorn him as a woman. Moe pretends to be playing a flute while Larry is "playing" the piano. Curly (in drag) is "heard" by the radio host Mrs. Bixby (Symona Boniface). Moe dubs Curly "Señorita Cucaracha," and the trio are hired to sing professionally on the radio, but must also appear at the home of the radio show's sponsor for a party.

The Stooges arrive at Mrs. Bixby's home and discover that the Italian baritone is also present. They proceed to sabotage his singing of "Vieni Sul Mar" by tossing cherries into his mouth, until he chokes on one and another guest is blamed. The team then has a brief quarrel prior to performing, resulting in Moe breaking the record over Curly's head. Ironically the quarrel was over protecting the record. Larry then notices a collection of records, hastily selects the "Lucia Sextet," and announces it as the "Sextet from Lucy". This song, however, requires pantomime by all three. This works well until the baritone recognizes them and unplugs the phonograph midway through the "Lucia Sextet", leaving the trio groaning out loud. They claim that Curly's voice is gone.

The trio tries to leave after the baritone makes a threatening gesture towards them. Alice Van Doren is also present at the party, and catches onto the boys' scheme. She aids them by singing "Voices of Spring" from behind a curtain, with Moe playing the flute off key, as Curly once again mimes the lyrics, so her father would properly judge her performance without knowing it was his daughter singing. The Italian baritone notices the ruse and revealing the trio as phonies and big fakes. He tosses a banana into Curly's mouth, pulls back the curtain hiding the real singer, and removes Curly's wig.

Alice's father, however, sees that his daughter has genuine talent, and decides she should indeed pursue her singing career. As for the Stooges, they are pelted with records by the guests as they make a quick exit from the party.

Production notes
Micro-Phonies was filmed on June 4–7, 1945, several months after Curly Howard suffered a mild stroke. His performances were marred by slurred speech and slower timing. Though Micro-Phonies was the first film released that was directed by novice director Edward Bernds, it was not his first attempt (the first being A Bird in the Head). Understandably, Bernds was excited at his big chance to direct, but was shocked when he saw how ill Curly had become. Years later, Bernds discussed his trying experience during the filming of A Bird in the Head:

Bernds feared that his directing days would be over as soon as they began if A Bird in the Head (featuring a sluggish Curly) was released as his first effort. Producer Hugh McCollum acted quickly, and reshuffled the release order of the films Bernds had directed (Bernds had already completed Micro-Phonies and The Three Troubledoers in addition to A Bird in the Head). As a result, the superior Micro-Phonies (in which Curly was in much better form) was released first, securing Bernds' directing position. Bernds would forever be indebted to McCollum for this act of kindness; henceforth, McCollum produced all of Bernds' Stooge films.

Bernds later recalled how Curly's condition was inconsistent:

Footage was reused in the 1960 compilation feature film Stop! Look! and Laugh!

Quotes
Moe: "Quiet, numbskulls, I'm broadcasting!"
Moe: (looking over a few records) "'Sextet by Lucy' ..." (turns to Curly) "Can you sing it?"
Curly: "Sing it? I can't even SAY it!"

References

External links 
 
 
Micro-Phonies  threestooges.net

1945 films
The Three Stooges films
American slapstick comedy films
American black-and-white films
Films directed by Edward Bernds
Columbia Pictures short films
1945 comedy films
1940s English-language films
1940s American films